Friedrich August Ferdinand Pettrich (1798 – 14 February 1872) was a German sculptor active in Germany, Brazil, the United States, and Italy. 
He was an internationally famous portrait sculptor who created busts of political figures in Washington D.C. as well as Native Americans such as Tecumseh. In the early 1840s he moved to Brazil to become the Court Sculptor to Emperor Dom Pedro II.

Life
Born in Dresden to sculptor Franz Pettrich, court sculptor to Elector Frederick Augustus III of Saxony, Pettrich studied in Rome under Bertel Thorvaldsen. After achieving fame in Europe, in 1835 Pettrich and his wife moved to the United States, first in Philadelphia, then Washington, D.C.  Pettrich died in Rome in 1872.

Sculptures by Pettrich

 The Dying Tecumseh
 Martin Van Buren
 John Vaughan (wine merchant)
 Washington Resigning His Commission
 Mrs. Frederich Augustus Ferdinand Pettrich
 Self-Portrait
 William Norris
 Our Lady of the Confederacy in the Cathedral of Saint John the Baptist (Charleston)

See also
 Vatican biography
 vatican-patrons.org page
 Biography page at fada.com
 Biography listing at Smithsonian American Art Museum
 Note in 1892 Corcoran Gallery of Art catalog

References

German sculptors
German male sculptors
American sculptors
Court sculptors
1798 births
1872 deaths
Masterpiece Museum